Andrew A. Weissmann (born March 17, 1958) is an American attorney. He was an Assistant United States Attorney from 1991 to 2002, where he prosecuted high-profile organized crime cases.

In 2002, President George W. Bush appointed Weissman to be the deputy director and then director of the Federal Bureau of Investigation's Enron Task Force. Weissman also served as the General Counsel of the Federal Bureau of Investigation from 2011 to 2013.

Starting in 2015, he became the chief of the Criminal Fraud Section of the U.S. Department of Justice. In June 2017, he was appointed to a management role on the 2017 special counsel team headed by Robert Mueller. To assume that position, Weissmann took a leave from his Department of Justice post. The special counsel's investigation concluded in 2019 and Weissmann went into the private sector.

Education

Weissmann has a bachelor's degree from Princeton University (1980). Following a Fulbright scholarship to the University of Geneva, he attended and graduated from Columbia Law School (1984). He then clerked for Judge Eugene Nickerson in the United States District Court for the Eastern District of New York.

Career
In 1991, Weissmann worked as an Assistant U.S. Attorney in the  U.S. Attorney's Office for the Eastern District of New York and would remain in this role until 2002. While at EDNY, Weissmann tried more than 25 cases, some of which involved members of the Genovese, Colombo and Gambino crime families. He led the prosecution team in the Vincent Gigante case, in which Gigante was convicted.

From 2002 to 2005, Weissmann was the deputy director appointed by George W. Bush, prior to his assignment as the director of the task force investigating the Enron scandal.  His work resulted in the prosecution of more than 30 people for crimes including perjury, fraud, and obstruction, including three of Enron's top executives, Andrew Fastow, Kenneth Lay, and Jeffrey Skilling. In a follow-up case in U.S. District Court, Weissmann also was successful, controversially, at arguing that auditing firm Arthur Andersen LLP had covered up for Enron. In that case, which resulted in the destruction of Andersen, he convinced the district judge to instruct the jury that they could convict the firm regardless of whether its employees knew they were violating the law. That ruling was later unanimously overturned by the Supreme Court in Arthur Andersen LLP v. United States, in which the court held that "the jury instructions failed to convey the requisite consciousness of wrongdoing." However, it was a Pyrrhic victory for the company. Some 7,000 jobs were lost.

In 2005, he worked as special counsel again with Mueller, before heading into private practice at Jenner & Block in New York after the special counsel completed its mandate. In 2011, he returned to the FBI, serving as General Counsel under Mueller. From 2015 to 2017, he headed the criminal fraud section at the Department of Justice. Weissmann has taught at NYU School of Law, Fordham Law School, and Brooklyn Law School.

On June 19, 2017, Weissmann joined Special Counsel Mueller's team to investigate Russian interference in the 2016 United States elections. He was called "the architect of the case against former Trump campaign chairman Paul Manafort". A news report in March 2019 said he would soon leave the Justice Department and become a faculty member at New York University and work on public service projects. Later that year, he also joined MSNBC as a legal analyst. In 2020, Weissmann returned to Jenner & Block as co-chair of its investigations, compliance and defense practice.

On September 29, 2020, Random House released a book by Weissmann titled Where Law Ends: Inside the Mueller Investigation. The book detailed several key aspects of the investigation, including the revelation that Rick Gates admitted to having given critical 2016 political polling data on battleground states on at least two occasions to Konstantin Kilimnik, who according to the F.B.I. had strong ties to the Russian intelligence community. A critical point that supported the charge of obstruction described in Weissman's book was that President Trump had reportedly discussed with his White House Counsel, Don McGahn, the possibility of firing Mueller from the investigation, then attempted a coverup of this discussion by requesting a statement be made from both McGahn and press secretary Sarah Huckabee Sanders that denied Trump had ever spoken to McGahn about firing Mueller.

Controversy
Weissmann has been described as a "pitbull" by the New York Times, and critics have said he deployed "hard-nosed tactics and a 'win-at-all-costs' mentality" in the Enron prosecution.

References

External links
 

1958 births
Living people
Princeton University alumni
Columbia Law School alumni
21st-century American lawyers
Members of the 2017 Special Counsel investigation team
People associated with Jenner & Block
Brooklyn Law School faculty
Jewish American attorneys